In mathematics, in the field of group theory, a subgroup of a group is said to be transitively normal in the group if every normal subgroup of the subgroup is also normal in the whole group.

An alternate way to characterize these subgroups is: every normal subgroup preserving automorphism of the whole group must restrict to a normal subgroup preserving automorphism of the subgroup.

Here are some facts about transitively normal subgroups:

Every normal subgroup of a transitively normal subgroup is normal.
Every direct factor, or more generally, every central factor is transitively normal. Thus, every central subgroup is transitively normal.
A transitively normal subgroup of a transitively normal subgroup is transitively normal.
A transitively normal subgroup is normal.

References

See also 
 Normal subgroup

Subgroup properties